Rhubarb Rhubarb is a 30-minute television comedy special made by Thames TV and transmitted in 1980. The special is a re-make of Eric Sykes' 1969  film, Rhubarb.

Plot
A police inspector is so intent on winning a round of golf against a vicar, despite his lack of ability at the game, that he employs his constable to furtively disentangle his ball from the odd spots in which it usually comes to rest - while his opponent looks for help from a higher power...

Said help takes on an increasingly miraculous appearance, to the extent of inanimate objects appearing to move in order to block the inspector's shots. However, when the vicar attempts to lie about the number of shots it took to free his ball from a sand trap he gets his comeuppance from a bolt of lightning.

In the final scene the entire game is revealed to have been a dream that the vicar had during a brief nap in church.

Dialogue
The word "rhubarb" is the only one uttered, many times over, in this film. (Likewise, the golf game takes place at the Royal Rhubarb golf course, and at one point a character is seen reading a newspaper called the Daily Rhubarb whose headlines consist entirely of the word 'rhubarb'.)

In the United Kingdom it is or was common for a crowd of extras in acting to shout the word "rhubarb" repeatedly and out of step with each other, to cause the effect of general hubbub. It was this use which inspired Sykes to use it as the only word in "Rhubarb Rhubarb".

Cast
Eric Sykes         ....  Police Inspector/Groom
Jimmy Edwards      ....  Police Officer
Bob Todd           ....  Vicar
Charlie Drake      ....  Golf Club Pro
Bill Fraser        ....  Golf Club Secretary
Hattie Jacques    ....  Nanny
Roy Kinnear        ....  Home Owner
Beryl Reid         ....  Home Owner's Wife
Norman Rossington  ....  Church Organist
April Walker       ....  Lady Golf Pupil/Bride
Nicholas Bond-Owen ....  Little Boy
Robert Carter      .... Baby

See also
 Walla
 Rhubarb the 1969 film remade for television as Rhubarb Rhubarb (1980) by Thames TV.

Sources
Rhubarb Rhubarb in the BBC Guide to Comedy

External links
 

1980 films
1980 comedy films
Remakes of British films
Films directed by Eric Sykes
1980 short films
British comedy short films
1980s English-language films
1980s British films
British comedy television films